Pacificincolidae is a family of bryozoans belonging to the order Cheilostomatida.

Genera:
 Burdwoodipora López Gappa, Liuzzi & Zelaya, 2017
 Pacificincola Liu & Liu, 1999
 Primavelans De Blauwe, 2006

References

Cheilostomatida